Atsumi Mana (渥美万奈, born 1 June 1989) is a Japanese softball player who plays as a infielder. She represented Japan at the 2020 Summer Olympics and won a gold medal. 

She participated at the 2013 Canada Cup and the 2016 Women's Softball World Championship.

Atsumi was a member of Japan's gold medal winning team at the 2020 Tokyo Olympics.  She helped turn a clutch double play in the 6th inning of the gold medal game against the American team, to maintain Japan's 2-0 lead.

References 

Living people
1989 births
Japanese softball players
Olympic softball players of Japan
Softball players at the 2020 Summer Olympics
Asian Games medalists in softball
Softball players at the 2018 Asian Games
Medalists at the 2018 Asian Games
Asian Games gold medalists for Japan
Olympic gold medalists for Japan
Olympic medalists in softball
Medalists at the 2020 Summer Olympics
21st-century Japanese women